Rogue, a police crime drama television series, premiered on DirecTV's Audience network on April 3, 2013, and ended on May 24, 2017. The series stars Thandie Newton and was filmed in Vancouver, British Columbia, Canada.

Series overview

Episodes

Season 1 (2013)

Season 2 (2014)

Season 3 (2015–16)

Season 4 (2017)

Home media

References 

Rogue
Lists of British crime drama television series episodes
Rogue